Erin Burger (born 10 February 1987) is a South African netball player. She plays in the positions of C, WA and WD. She is a member of the South Africa national netball team and has competed in the 2010 Commonwealth Games in Delhi, the 2007 World Netball Championships in Auckland and the 2011 World Netball Championships in Singapore. She has also participated in the 2010 World Netball Series and the 2011 World Netball Series, both held in Liverpool, UK.

References
 Netball South Africa official player profile. Retrieved on 2011-11-29.
 Erin Burger player profile, Netball England website. Retrieved on 2011-11-29.

South African netball players
Commonwealth Games competitors for South Africa
Netball players at the 2010 Commonwealth Games
Netball players at the 2018 Commonwealth Games
1987 births
Living people
2019 Netball World Cup players
South African expatriate netball people in Australia
Queensland Firebirds players
Sportspeople from Pretoria
2011 World Netball Championships players